Šentvid pri Lukovici ( or) is a settlement in the Municipality of Lukovica in the eastern part of the Upper Carniola region of Slovenia.

Name
The name of the settlement was changed from Šent Vid to Šentvid pri Lukovici in 1955. In the past the German name was Sankt Veit.

Church

The local church, which the settlement gets its name from, is dedicated to Saint Vitus.

References

External links

Šentvid pri Lukovici on Geopedia

Populated places in the Municipality of Lukovica